Hodar or HODAR can refer to: 

Malem-Hodar Arrondissement, an arrondissement of the Kaffrine Department in the Kaffrine Region of Senegal
Malem Hodar Department, one of the departments of Senegal 
Husband of a Daughter of the American Revolution (acronym)